Gang Tapes is a 2001 crime film directed by Adam Ripp and starring Darris Love, Darontay McClendon, and Don Cambell. It has not been considered a mainstream success but did create a cult following.

Plot
When teenaged Kris (Trivell) receives a camera from a friend that carjacks a visiting family member's vehicle, he also steals their video camera and begins recording gang life in South Central Los Angeles. Kris himself is a wannabe gang member, and the young man looks up to drug dealer Alonzo (Darris Love).

He excitedly follows the violent exploits of the crazed Cyril (Darontay McClendon). As Kris becomes more deeply involved with his dangerous new friends, his loving mother (Sonja Marie) tries to keep him off the streets.

See also 
 List of hood films

References

External links
 
 
 
 

2001 films
2000s crime films
Found footage films
Hood films
2000s American films